DC Comics Bonus Books were 16-page comic book stories inserted into issues of existing DC Comics series to showcase new writers and artists. Running from April 1988 to February 1989, they consisted of a front cover, 14 pages of story, and a back cover with a brief biography of the story's creators. The addition of the insert did not entail an increase in the price of the comic book. The Bonus Books featured early work by such comics creators as Mark Askwith, Jim Balent, Randy DuBurke, Dean Haspiel, Rob Liefeld, Gordon Purcell, and Denis Rodier.

The issues

See also 
 DC Comics insert previews

References

External links 
 DC Bonus Book at the Comic Book DB
 DC Bonus Books at Mike's Amazing World of Comics
 DC Timeline 1986-1989 
 DC Bonus Book #7 review at Boosterrific.com

Superhero comics
1988 comics debuts
1988 in comics
1989 comics endings
1989 in comics
DC Comics-related lists
Defunct American comics